Vermont Route 191 (VT 191) is a short  state highway in Orleans County, Vermont, United States. It serves as a connection from Interstate 91 (I-91) in Derby to U.S. Route 5 (US 5) and VT 105 in the city of Newport. The route is signed north–south, but it runs almost entirely from east to west.

Route description

Vermont Route 191 begins in the south at an interchange with I-91 at Exit 27, located southwest of the town of Derby, and east-southeast of the city of Newport.  Route 191 heads to the northwest, passing into the city after a couple of miles. About  from its end, Route 191 splits into a four-lane divided highway, and passes westward into the heart of the city.  It ends at an intersection with the "Causeway" (US 5, VT 105).

Major intersections

References

External links

191
Transportation in Orleans County, Vermont